Native Instruments is a German company that develops, manufactures, and supplies music software and hardware for music production, sound design, performance, and DJing. The company's corporate headquarters and main development facilities are located in Berlin, with additional offices in Los Angeles, Tokyo, London, Paris, and Shenzhen.

History 
Native Instruments as a company was founded in 1999 in Berlin, Germany, where its headquarters are still located. Founders Stephan Schmitt and Volker Hinz began using the name Native Instruments in 1996, when they developed Generator, a modular synth software package (which would later form the foundations for their ongoing product, Reaktor).

Following the release of Generator, the company's employees expanded to include Bernd Roggendorf (later a founder of Ableton) and Daniel Haver, who later became Native Instruments' CEO.

In 1999, Native Instruments expanded their staff count and moved to their current building in Berlin's Kreuzberg district.

In 2000, the company began creating products for the DJ community, beginning with the first version of their Traktor software. In 2002, they expanded further to include software samplers, in the form of ongoing products Kontakt and Battery.

In September 2004, the company began a partnership with the DJ hardware manufacturing company Stanton Magnetics and with online music store Beatport. 2004 also saw the release of their guitar amplifier and effects pedal emulation software, Guitar Rig. In 2006, Native Instruments restructured into 3 divisions: instruments, DJ, and guitar.

In March 2017, Native Instruments acquired remix-licensing startup MetaPop. 

In January 2020, a works council was elected that represents the employees of the Berlin office.

In January 2021, it was reported that private investment firm, Francisco Partners acquired a majority stake in Native Instruments.

Native Instruments now also has offices in Los Angeles, Tokyo, London, Paris, and Shenzhen.

In April 2022, Native instruments became a subsidiary brand of Soundwide.

Products

Software 

Software produced by Native Instruments includes the following:

 Reaktor: A visual programming environment based on modules and wires. Several of Native Instruments products were built using Reaktor, including Monark – NI's emulation of the Moog Model D. In addition to the company's own offerings, it also hosts a large collection of community creations on the Reaktor User Library.
 Kontakt: A software sampler with support for users to program their own virtual instruments. 
 Guitar Rig: A modular software effect processor, focused on amplifier and effects pedal emulation for guitar. 
 Multiple software synthesizers, such as Massive (wavetable-based), Absynth (semi-modular), and FM8 (frequency-modulation-based). 
 Traktor: Digital DJ and vinyl emulation software.
Native instruments also produce a number of other sample libraries, virtual instruments and effects processing plug-ins, many of which function through the architecture of Reaktor or Kontakt. Some of these software items are also grouped together in their Komplete software bundle.

The company also develops the Native Kontrol Standard (NKS), a plug-in extension which allows integration with Kontrol and Maschine products (both hardware and software).

Hardware 

Native instruments also produce music hardware, such as:
 Maschine: A system with integrated software for creating drum beats.
 Kontrol: A series of MIDI controllers, audio interfaces and DJ controllers with software instrument support.

References

External links
 
 Daniel Haver Interview NAMM Oral History Library (2021)

 
Software companies of Germany
Privately held companies of Germany
Companies established in 1996